The 1998–99 Ohio Bobcats men's basketball team represented Ohio University in the college basketball season of 1998–99. The team was coached by Larry Hunter and played their home games at the Convocation Center.

Roster

Schedule and results
Source:  

|-
!colspan=9 style=| Regular Season

|-
!colspan=9 style=| MAC Tournament
|-

Statistics

Team Statistics
Final 1998–99 Statistics

Source

Player statistics

Source

References

Ohio Bobcats men's basketball seasons
Ohio
Bob
Bob